The 1985–86 Temple Owls men's basketball team represented Temple University as a member of the Atlantic 10 Conference during the 1985–86 NCAA Division I men's basketball season. Led by fourth-year head coach John Chaney, the Owls played their home games at McGonigle Hall in Philadelphia, Pennsylvania. Temple finished tied for second place in the A-10 regular season standings, then lost in the quarterfinals of the A-10 tournament. The Owls received an at-large bid to the NCAA tournament. As No. 9 seed in the Midwest region, the Owls defeated Jacksonville in the opening round before falling to No. 1 seed and eventual Final Four participant Kansas, 65–43. The team finished with a record of 25–6 (15–3 A-10).

Roster

Schedule

|-
!colspan=12 style=| Regular season

|-
!colspan=12 style=| Atlantic 10 Tournament

|-
!colspan=12 style=| NCAA Tournament

Rankings

References

Temple Owls men's basketball seasons
Temple
Temple
Temple
Temple